Midcap may refer to:

MidCap Advisors, LLC, an established boutique investment bank
CBV MidCap, stock market index indicating 30 out of 60 stock prices of medium-size companies in Vietnam
Dagmar Midcap (born 1969), media personality originally based in Vancouver, British Columbia
Russell Midcap Index, stock index of US stocks

See also
Mid cap